The Surya Siddhanta is a Sanskrit treatise in Indian astronomy dated to 505 CE, in fourteen chapters. The Surya Siddhanta describes rules to calculate the motions of various planets and the moon relative to various constellations, diameters of various planets, and calculates the orbits of various astronomical bodies. The text is known from a  palm-leaf manuscript, and several newer manuscripts. It was composed or revised c. 800 CE from an earlier text also called the Surya Siddhanta. The Surya Siddhanta text is composed of verses made up of two lines, each broken into two halves, or pãds, of eight syllables each.

As described by al-Biruni, the 11th-century Persian scholar and polymath, a text named the Surya Siddhanta was written by Lātadeva, a student of Aryabhatta I. The second verse of the first chapter of the Surya Siddhanta attributes the words to an emissary of the solar deity of Hindu mythology, Surya, as recounted to an asura called Maya at the end of Satya Yuga, the first golden age from Hindu texts, around two million years ago.

The text asserts, according to Markanday and Srivatsava, that the earth is of a spherical shape. The text is known for some of earliest known discussion of sexagesimal fractions and trigonometric functions.

The Surya Siddhanta is one of several astronomy-related Hindu texts. It represents a functional system that made reasonably accurate predictions. The text was influential on the solar year computations of the luni-solar Hindu calendar. The text was translated into Arabic and was influential in medieval Islamic geography. The Surya Siddhanta has the largest number of commentators among all the astronomical texts written in India. It includes information about the orbital parameters of the planets, such as the number of revolutions per Mahayuga, the longitudinal changes of the orbits, and also includes supporting evidence and calculation methods.

Textual history

In a work called the Pañca-siddhāntikā composed in the sixth century by Varāhamihira, five astronomical treatises are named and summarised: Paulīśa-siddhānta, Romaka-siddhānta, Vasiṣṭha-siddhānta, Sūrya-siddhānta, and Paitāmaha-siddhānta. Most scholars place the surviving version of the text variously from the 4th-century to 5th-century CE, although it is dated to about the 6th-century BCE by Markandaya and Srivastava.

According to John Bowman, the version of the text existed between 350 and 400 CE wherein it referenced sexagesimal fractions and trigonometric functions, but the text was a living document and revised through about the 10th-century. One of the evidence for the Surya Siddhanta being a living text is the work of medieval Indian scholar Utpala, who cites and then quotes ten verses from a version of Surya Siddhanta, but these ten verses are not found in any surviving manuscripts of the text. According to Kim Plofker, large portions of the more ancient Sūrya-siddhānta was incorporated into the Panca siddhantika text, and a new version of the Surya Siddhanta was likely revised and composed around 800 CE. Some scholars refer to Panca siddhantika as the old Surya Siddhanta and date it to 505 CE.

Vedic influence 
The Surya Siddhanta is a text on astronomy and time keeping, an idea that appears much earlier as the field of Jyotisha (Vedanga) of the Vedic period. The field of Jyotisha deals with ascertaining time, particularly forecasting auspicious dates and times for Vedic rituals. Vedic sacrifices state that the ancient Vedic texts describe four measures of time – savana, solar, lunar and sidereal, as well as twenty seven constellations using Taras (stars). According to mathematician and classicist David Pingree, in the Hindu text Atharvaveda (~1000 BCE or older) the idea already appears of twenty eight constellations and movement of astronomical bodies.

According to Pingree, the influence may have flowed the other way initially, then flowed into India after the arrival of Darius and the Achaemenid conquest of the Indus Valley about 500 BCE. The mathematics and devices for time keeping mentioned in these ancient Sanskrit texts, proposes Pingree, such as the water clock may also have thereafter arrived in India from Mesopotamia. However, Yukio Ohashi considers this proposal as incorrect, suggesting instead that the Vedic timekeeping efforts, for forecasting appropriate time for rituals, must have begun much earlier and the influence may have flowed from India to Mesopotamia. Ohashi states that it is incorrect to assume that the number of civil days in a year equal 365 in both Indian (Hindu) and Egyptian–Persian year. Further, adds Ohashi, the Mesopotamian formula is different than Indian formula for calculating time, each can only work for their respective latitude, and either would make major errors in predicting time and calendar in the other region.

Kim Plofker states that while a flow of timekeeping ideas from either side is plausible, each may have instead developed independently, because the loan-words typically seen when ideas migrate are missing on both sides as far as words for various time intervals and techniques.

Greek influence 
It is hypothesized that contacts between the ancient Indian scholarly tradition and Hellenistic Greece via the Indo-Greek Kingdom after the Indian campaign of Alexander the Great, specifically regarding the work of Hipparchus (2nd-century BCE), explain some similarities between Surya Siddhanta and Greek astronomy in the Hellenistic period. For example, Surya Siddhanta provides table of sines function which parallel the Hipparchian table of chords, though the Indian calculations are more accurate and detailed. According to Alan Cromer, the knowledge exchange with the Greeks may have occurred by about 100 BCE. According to Alan Cromer, the Greek influence most likely arrived in India by about 100 BCE. The Indians adopted the Hipparchus system, according to Cromer, and it remained that simpler system rather than those made by Ptolemy in the 2nd century.

The influence of Greek ideas on early medieval era Indian astronomical theories, particularly zodiac symbols (astrology), is broadly accepted by the Western scholars. According to Pingree, the 2nd-century CE cave inscriptions of Nasik mention sun, moon and five planets in the same order as found in Babylon, but "there is no hint, however, that the Indian had learned a method of computing planetary positions in this period". In the 2nd-century CE, a scholar named Yavanesvara translated a Greek astrological text, and another unknown individual translated a second Greek text into Sanskrit. Thereafter started the diffusion of Greek and Babylonian ideas on astronomy and astrology into India. The other evidence of European influential on the Indian thought is Romaka Siddhanta, a title of one of the Siddhanta texts contemporary to Surya Siddhanta, a name that betrays its origin and probably was derived from a translation of a European text by Indian scholars in Ujjain, then the capital of an influential central Indian large kingdom.

According to mathematician and historian of measurement John Roche, the astronomical and mathematical methods developed by Greeks related arcs to chords of spherical trigonometry. The Indian mathematical astronomers, in their texts such as the Surya Siddhanta, developed other linear measures of angles, made their calculations differently, "introduced the versine, which is the difference between the radius and cosine, and discovered various trigonometrical identities". For instance "where the Greeks had adopted 60 relative units for the radius, and 360 for circumference", the Indians chose 3,438 units and 60x360 for the circumference thereby calculating the "ratio of circumference to diameter [pi, π] of about 3.1414".
The Surya Siddhanta was one of the two books in Sanskrit that were translated into Arabic in the later half of the eighth century during the reign of Abbasid caliph Al-Mansur.

Importance in history of science 

The tradition of Hellenistic astronomy ended in the West after Late Antiquity. According to Cromer, the Surya Siddhanta and other Indian texts reflect the primitive state of Greek science, nevertheless played an important part in the history of science, through its translation in Arabic and stimulating the Arabic sciences. According to a study by Dennis Duke that compares Greek models with Indian models based on the oldest Indian manuscripts such as the Surya Siddhanta with fully described models, the Greek influence on Indian astronomy is strongly likely to be pre-Ptolemaic.

The Surya Siddhanta was one of the two books in Sanskrit translated into Arabic in the later half of the eighth century during the reign of Abbasid caliph Al-Mansur. According to Muzaffar Iqbal, this translation and that of Aryabhatta was of considerable influence on geographic, astronomy and related Islamic scholarship.

Contents

The contents of the Surya Siddhanta is written in classical Indian poetry tradition, where complex ideas are expressed lyrically with a rhyming meter in the form of a terse shloka. This method of expressing and sharing knowledge made it easier to remember, recall, transmit and preserve knowledge. However, this method also meant secondary rules of interpretation, because numbers don't have rhyming synonyms. The creative approach adopted in the Surya Siddhanta was to use symbolic language with double meanings. For example, instead of one, the text uses a word that means moon because there is one moon. To the skilled reader, the word moon means the number one. The entire table of trigonometric functions, sine tables, steps to calculate complex orbits, predict eclipses and keep time are thus provided by the text in a poetic form. This cryptic approach offers greater flexibility for poetic construction.

The Surya Siddhanta thus consists of cryptic rules in Sanskrit verse. It is a compendium of astronomy that is easier to remember, transmit and use as reference or aid for the experienced, but does not aim to offer commentary, explanation or proof. The text has 14 chapters and 500 shlokas. It is one of the eighteen astronomical siddhanta (treatises), but thirteen of the eighteen are believed to be lost to history. The Surya Siddhanta text has survived since the ancient times, has been the best known and the most referred astronomical text in the Indian tradition.

The fourteen chapters of the Surya Siddhanta are as follows, per the much cited Burgess translation:

The methods for computing time using the shadow cast by a gnomon are discussed in both Chapters 3 and 13.

Description of Time 
The author of Surya Siddhanta defines time as of two types: the first which is continuous and endless, destroys all animate and inanimate objects and second is time which can be known. This latter type is further defined as having two types: the first is Murta (Measureable) and Amurta (immeasureable because it is too small or too big). The time Amurta is a time that begins with an infinitesimal portion of time (Truti) and Murta is a time that begins with 4-second time pulses called Prana as described in the table below. The further description of Amurta time is found in Puranas where as Surya Siddhanta sticks with measurable time.

The text measures a savana day from sunrise to sunrise. Thirty of these savana days make a savana month. A solar (saura) month starts with the entrance of the sun into a zodiac sign, thus twelve months make a year.

North pole star and South pole star
Surya Siddhanta asserts that there are two pole stars, one each at north and south celestial pole. Surya Siddhanta chapter 12 verse 43 description is as following:

मेरोरुभयतो मध्ये ध्रुवतारे नभ:स्थिते।
निरक्षदेशसंस्थानामुभये क्षितिजाश्रिये॥१२:४३॥

This translates as "On both sides of the Meru (i.e. the north and south poles of the earth) the two polar stars are situated in the heaven at their zenith. These two stars are in the horizon of the cities situated on the equinoctial regions".

The Sine table 
The Surya Siddhanta provides methods of calculating the sine values in chapter 2. It divides the quadrant of a circle with radius 3438 into 24 equal segments or sines as described in the table. In modern-day terms, each of these 24 segments has angle of 3.75°.

The 1st order difference is the value by which each successive sine increases from the previous and similarly the 2nd order difference is the increment in the 1st order difference values. Burgess says, it is remarkable to see that the 2nd order differences increase as the sines and each, in fact, is about 1/225th part of the corresponding sine.

Calculation of tilt of Earth's axis (Obliquity) 
The tilt of the ecliptic varies between 22.1° to 24.5° and is currently 23.5°. Following the sine tables and methods of calculating the sines, Surya Siddhanta also attempts to calculate the Earth's tilt of contemporary times as described in chapter 2 and verse 28, the obliquity of the Earth's axis, the verse says "The sine of greatest declination is 1397; by this multiply any sine, and divide by radius; the arc corresponding to the result is said to be the declination". The greatest declination is the inclination of the plane of the ecliptic. With radius of 3438 and sine of 1397, the corresponding angle is 23.975° or 23° 58' 30.65" which is approximated to be 24°.

Planets and their characteristics

The text treats earth as a stationary globe around which sun, moon and five planets orbit. It makes no mention of Uranus, Neptune and Pluto. It presents mathematical formulae to calculate the orbits, diameters, predict their future locations and cautions that the minor corrections are necessary over time to the formulae for the various astronomical bodies.

The text describes some of its formulae with the use of very large numbers for "divya-yuga", stating that at the end of this yuga, Earth and all astronomical bodies return to the same starting point and the cycle of existence repeats again. These very large numbers based on divya-yuga, when divided and converted into decimal numbers for each planet, give reasonably accurate sidereal periods when compared to modern era western calculations.

Calendar

The solar part of the luni-solar Hindu calendar is based on the Surya Siddhanta. The various old and new versions of Surya Siddhanta manuscripts yield the same solar calendar. According to J. Gordon Melton, both the Hindu and Buddhist calendars that are in use in South and Southeast Asia are rooted in this text, but the regional calendars adapted and modified them over time.

The Surya Siddhanta calculates the solar year to be 365 days 6 hours 12 minutes and 36.56 seconds. On average, according to the text, the lunar month equals 27 days 7 hours 39 minutes 12.63 seconds. It states that the lunar month varies over time, and this needs to be factored in for accurate time keeping.

According to Whitney, the Surya Siddhanta calculations were tolerably accurate and achieved predictive usefulness. In Chapter 1 of Surya Siddhanta, "the Hindu year is too long by nearly three minutes and a half; but the moon's revolution is right within a second; those of Mercury, Venus and Mars within a few minutes; that of Jupiter within six or seven hours; that of Saturn within six days and a half".

The Surya Siddhanta was one of the two books in Sanskrit translated into Arabic during the reign of 'Abbasid caliph al-Mansur. According to Muzaffar Iqbal, this translation and that of Aryabhata was of considerable influence on geographic, astronomy and related Islamic scholarship.

Editions
The Súrya-Siddhánta, an antient system of Hindu astronomy ed. FitzEdward Hall and Bápú Deva Śástrin (1859).
Translation of the Sûrya-Siddhânta: A text-book of Hindu astronomy, with notes and an appendix by Ebenezer Burgess Originally published: Journal of the American Oriental Society 6 (1860) 141–498. Commentary by Burgess is much larger than his translation.
Surya-Siddhanta: A Text Book of Hindu Astronomy translated by Ebenezer Burgess, ed. Phanindralal Gangooly (1989/1997) with a 45-page commentary by P. C. Sengupta (1935).
 Translation of the Surya Siddhanta by Bapu Deva Sastri (1861) , . Only a few notes. Translation of Surya Siddhanta occupies first 100 pages; rest is a translation of the Siddhanta Siromani by Lancelot Wilkinson.

Commentaries 

The historical popularity of Surya Siddhanta is attested by the existence of at least 26 commentaries, plus another 8 anonymous commentaries. Some of the Sanskrit-language commentaries include the following; nearly all the commentators have re-arranged and modified the text:

 Surya-siddhanta-tika (1178) by Mallikarjuna Suri
 Surya-siddhanta-bhashya (1185) by Chandeshvara, a Maithila Brahmana
 Vasanarnava (c. 1375-1400) by Maharajadhiraja Madana-pala of Taka family
 Surya-siddhanta-vivarana (1432) by Parameshvara of Kerala
 Kalpa-valli (1472) by Yallaya of Andhra-desha
 Surya-siddhanta-vivarana (1572) by Bhudhara of Kampilya
 Kamadogdhri (1599) by Tamma Yajvan of Paragipuri
 Gudhartha-prakashaka (1603) by Ranganatha of Kashi
 Saura-bhashya (1611) by Nrsimha of Kashi
 Gahanartha-prakasha (IAST: Gūḍhārthaprakāśaka, 1628) by Vishvanatha of Kashi
 Saura-vasana' (after 1658) by Kamalakara of Kashi
 Kiranavali (1719) by Dadabhai, a Chittpavana Brahmana
 Surya-siddhanta-tika (date unknown) by Kama-bhatta of southern India
 Ganakopakarini (date unknown) by Chola Vipashchit of southern India
 Gurukataksha' (date unknown) by Bhuti-vishnu of southern India

Mallikarjuna Suri had written a Telugu language commentary on the text before composing the Sanskrit-language Surya-siddhanta-tika in 1178. Kalpakurti Allanarya-suri wrote another Telugu language commentary on the text, known from a manuscript copied in 1869.

See also
Hindu units of measurement
Indian science and technology

References

Bibliography

 K. V. Sarma (1997), "Suryasiddhanta", Encyclopaedia of the History of Science, Technology, and Medicine in Non-Western Cultures edited by Helaine Selin, Springer, 

Further reading
 Victor J. Katz. A History of Mathematics: An Introduction'', 1998.

External links

Ahargana - The Astronomy of the Hindu Calendar Explains the various calendric elements of the Hindu calendar by means of astronomical simulations created using Stellarium. The definitions of the various calendric elements are obtained from Surya Siddhantha.
Surya Siddhantha Planetary Model A geometric model that illustrates the Surya Siddhantha model of the orbital movement of the planets. In this model, the asterism are not stationary but exhibit high-speed movement which is faster than the planets. As a result the planets seem to "fall behind" thus creating orbital movement.
Surya Siddhanta Sanskrit text in Devanagari
Remarks on the Astronomy of the Brahmins, John Playfair (Archive)

Hindu astronomy
Hindu astrological texts
Astronomy books
History of geometry
Articles containing video clips
Indian astronomy texts
Ancient Indian astronomical works
Ancient Indian mathematical works